Allison Pearl is an American para-alpine skier. She represented the United States at the 2002 Winter Paralympics in alpine skiing.

She won the gold medal in the Women's Giant Slalom LW12 event. She also competed in the Women's Super-G LW10-12 event and the Women's Slalom LW10-12 but she did not finish in either event.

References 

Living people
Year of birth missing (living people)
Place of birth missing (living people)
Paralympic alpine skiers of the United States
American female alpine skiers
Alpine skiers at the 2002 Winter Paralympics
Medalists at the 2002 Winter Paralympics
Paralympic gold medalists for the United States
Paralympic medalists in alpine skiing
21st-century American women